Nokia 2323 classic is a basic 2G feature phone released by Nokia on 1 July 2009. The mobile phone is aimed at emerging markets and budget-conscious consumers, and can be bought carrier-unlocked for a relatively low price. 
The device runs on the Series 40 software platform, supports up to five separate address books, and is able to store personalisation data for up to five separate SIM cards.
Nokia 2323 classic is available in a number of languages depending on which territory it is marketed for. Models sold in Europe support at least thirty three languages. A similar model of Nokia 2323 classic known as Nokia 2330 classic has the same features as 2323 classic, with the only main difference being the addition of a VGA camera.

References

External links 

2323 classic